Slav'sya otechestvo, nashe svobodnoye may refer to:

 State Anthem of the Soviet Union
 State Anthem of the Russian Federation